Francesca McKnight Donatella Romana Gregorini di Savignano di Romagna (born August7, 1968), known professionally as Francesca Gregorini, is an Italian-American screenwriter and film director.

Early life 

Born in Rome, Gregorini is the daughter of former "Bond girl" Barbara Bach and businessman  Augusto Gregorini Savignano di Romagna from Savignano sul Rubicone. Her mother (born Barbara Goldbach) is of Jewish and Irish descent. Gregorini is also the stepdaughter of Beatles drummer Ringo Starr, with whom she is close. After boarding at TASIS, she attended Brown University graduating in 1990.

Career 

Gregorini contributed two songs to the soundtrack of the film See Jane Run (2001), in which she also had a small acting role. She worked as a musician with her first CD "Sequel" (2003), where she sings, and plays the guitar and bass.

Gregorini sold scripts to both HBO and Paramount Pictures before co-helming, with Princess Tatiana von Fürstenberg, her directorial debut Tanner Hall, a coming of age story set in an all-girls boarding school in Rhode Island, starring Rooney Mara. Gregorini and von Fürstenberg also co-wrote the independent film, loosely based on their own adolescent experiences. Gregorini said in an interview, "Naturally there are some autobiographical elements, combined with things we'd witness in boarding school, and many other parts that we made up completely. You will certainly find characteristics of both of us in each of the four main girls and if you spend even a half-hour with us, it will be very apparent to you, which girls are most like me and which ones are most like Tatiana." The film was an official selection at the 2009 Toronto International Film Festival.

Gregorini's film The Truth About Emanuelstarring Jessica Biel, Kaya Scodelario and Alfred Molinawas selected for the US dramatic competition at the 2013 Sundance Film Festival.

In summer 2018, The Hollywood Reporter wrote that Killing Eve creator Phoebe Waller-Bridge hired Gregorini as a director for the show's second series.

In January 2020, Francesca Gregorini filed a lawsuit against Servant producers including Tony Basgallop and M. Night Shyamalan, the production companies involved, and Apple TV+, alleging copyright infringement for her 2013 drama film, The Truth About Emanuel. Basgallop and Shyamalan responded that neither had seen her film and that any similarity is coincidence. On May 28, 2020, a federal judge threw out the copyright lawsuit against Shyamalan and Apple, ruling that the TV show is not similar enough to the film to merit a lawsuit. On July 21, 2020, the court ordered Gregorini to pay the defendants' attorneys' fees of $162,467.30.
She is producing HULU's 2022 episodic series “The Dropout” about Elizabeth Holmes of Theranos.

Personal life 
Gregorini was in a relationship with actress Portia de Rossi from 2000 to 2004. Since January 2014, she has been dating producer Morgan Marling, sister of actress Brit Marling.

References

External links 

Official site

1968 births
Living people
21st-century American women writers
American women singer-songwriters
American people of Italian descent
Brown University alumni
American people of Austrian-Jewish descent
American people of German-Jewish descent
American people of Irish descent
American people of Romanian-Jewish descent
Italian emigrants to the United States
Italian countesses
Italian LGBT singers
American LGBT singers
Italian LGBT songwriters
American LGBT songwriters
American lesbian musicians
Italian lesbian musicians
LGBT nobility
Lesbian songwriters
Lesbian singers
Musicians from Rome
People educated at the American School in England
Ringo Starr
20th-century American women singers
Moses Brown School alumni
20th-century American singers
20th-century American LGBT people
21st-century American LGBT people
American lesbian writers